Fission is a studio album by keyboardist Jens Johansson, released in 1997 through Heptagon Records (Europe); February 18, 1998 through Pony Canyon (Japan); and on March 24, 1998, through Shrapnel Records (United States). According to Johansson, the album went through an extremely troubled recording process due to several mishaps with Andy West's bass parts, which ultimately never made the album. On his website, Johansson also revealed that the indistinct image on the cover art is actually a heavily zoomed-in section of ice on a car window.

Track listing

Personnel
Jens Johansson – keyboard, bass synthesizer, production
Shawn Lane – guitar (tracks 1, 4)
Mike Stern – guitar (tracks 2, 4, 6)
Anders Johansson – drums, percussion
Julian Baker – engineering
Werner Kracht – engineering
Peter Nilsson – engineering
Scud Noonan – engineering
Krister Olsson – mastering

References

External links
In Review: Jens Johansson "Fission" at Guitar Nine Records

Jens Johansson albums
1998 albums
Pony Canyon albums
Shrapnel Records albums